The wild card was established for Major League Baseball's playoffs in  with the intention of helping the best teams that did not win their division to still have a chance to win the World Series. The restructuring of both the American League and National League from two to three divisions each made it necessary to either give one team a bye in the first round of playoffs, or create the wild card for the best second-place team. In addition, the wild card guaranteed that the team with the second-best record in each league would qualify for the playoffs, even if they were in the same division with the team having the best record. As the 1994 postseason was canceled due to the 1994–95 Major League Baseball strike,  was the first postseason with a wild card team.

Beginning in 2012, a second wild card team was added to each league. The two wild card teams in each league face each other in a one-game playoff, the Wild Card Game, with the winner advancing to meet the number one seed in the Division Series.

For the 2020 postseason only, the field expanded to include three second-place teams per division, followed by the wild card teams represented by the next two best records from each league. All eight teams played in a best-of-three Wild Card Series.

Starting in 2022, a third wild card team was added to each league. The lowest-seeded wild card team (#6 seed) would then face the lowest-seeded division winner (#3 seed) in the best-of-three Wild Card round, with the remaining two Wild Card teams (#4 and #5 seed) squaring off in the other bracket. The Division Series will then have the top-seed play the fourth-fifth winner, while the runner-up plays the third-sixth winner. The brackets remain fixed, with no re-seeding.

AL Wild Card qualifiers by year

Through the 2021 postseason, there have been a total of 37 AL wild card teams (one each season during 1995–2011, and two each season since 2012). The AL East has produced 24, the AL Central five, and the AL West eight. The Boston Red Sox and the New York Yankees have been a wild card qualifier a record eight times each.

Through the 2020 postseason, two AL wild card teams have gone on win the World Series (Anaheim in 2002 and Boston in 2004), two teams won the AL pennant but lost the World Series (Detroit in 2006 and Kansas City in 2014), and eight other teams won a division series but lost the championship series, most recently the Yankees in 2017.

Most AL Wild Card appearances

Notes:
 The Los Angeles Angels were known as the Anaheim Angels during 1997–2004.
 The Houston Astros competed in the National League before 2013.
 The Cleveland Guardians were known as the Cleveland Indians before 2022.

See also

American League Division Series
List of National League Wild Card winners
Major League Baseball division winners
Wild card (sports)#Major League Baseball
Wild card (sports)#Record disparities

References

American
Wild Card